The 1986 Langs Supreme Scottish Masters was a professional non-ranking snooker tournament that took place between 18 and 21 September 1986 at the Hospitality Inn in Glasgow, Scotland.

Cliff Thorburn retained the title by defeating Alex Higgins 9–8 in the final. At the same match, Higgins won £1,000 for the highest break of the championship with 131, which was made in the final.

The event was played at the same time as the Matchroom Professional Championship which involved six players from the Matchroom Sport stable, including Steve Davis.

Tournament draw

References

1986
Masters
Scottish Masters
Scottish Masters